Great Paxton is a village and civil parish in Cambridgeshire, England lying  north of St Neots in the Great Ouse river valley.

The population was 1,007 in the 2011 census. Despite its name, Great Paxton is much smaller than the neighbouring village of Little Paxton.

History
In 1085 William the Conqueror ordered that a survey should be carried out across his kingdom to discover who owned which parts and what it was worth. The survey took place in 1086 and the results were recorded in what, since the 12th century, has become known as the Domesday Book. Starting with the king himself, for each landholder within a county there is a list of their estates or manors; and, for each manor, there is a summary of the resources of the manor, the amount of annual rent that was collected by the lord of the manor both in 1066 and in 1086, together with the taxable value.

Great Paxton was listed in the Domesday Book in the Hundred of Toseland in Huntingdonshire; the name of the settlement was written as Pachstone and Parchestune in the Domesday Book. In 1086 there was just one manor at Great Paxton; the annual rent paid to the lord of the manor in 1066 had been £29.2 and the rent had increased to £33.5 in 1086.

The Domesday Book does not explicitly detail the population of a place but it records that there was 69 households at Great Paxton. There is no consensus about the average size of a household at that time; estimates range from 3.5 to 5.0 people per household. Using these figures then an estimate of the population of Great Paxton in 1086 is that it was within the range of 241 and 345 people.

The Domesday Book uses a number of units of measure for areas of land that are now unfamiliar terms, such as hides and ploughlands. By 1086, the hide had become a unit of tax assessment rather than an actual land area; a hide was the amount of land that could be assessed as £1 for tax purposes. The survey records that there were 39 ploughlands at Great Paxton in 1086 and that there was the capacity for a further two ploughlands.

The tax assessment in the Domesday Book was known as geld or danegeld and was a type of land-tax based on the hide or ploughland. It was originally a way of collecting a tribute to pay off the Danes when they attacked England, and was only levied when necessary. Following the Norman Conquest, the geld was used to raise money for the King and to pay for continental wars; by 1130, the geld was being collected annually. Having determined the value of a manor's land and other assets, a tax of so many shillings and pence per pound of value would be levied on the land holder. While this was typically two shillings in the pound the amount did vary; for example, in 1084 it was as high as six shillings in the pound.  For the manor at Great Paxton the total tax assessed was 25 geld.

By 1086 there was already a church and a priest at Great Paxton.

The manor of Great Paxton was held by Countess Judith who was a niece of William the Conqueror. The manor lands were held by the Earls of Huntingdon until c.1192 and shortly afterwards the manor was split into two-halves, de la Haye's manor and Great Paxton manor.  There were fisheries on the Great Ouse at Great Paxton belonging to both manors from before 1279.

Government
As a civil parish, Great Paxton has a parish council. The parish council is elected by the residents of the parish who have registered on the electoral roll; the parish council is the lowest tier of government in England. A parish council is responsible for providing and maintaining a variety of local services including allotments and a cemetery; grass cutting and tree planting within public open spaces such as a village green or playing fields. The parish council reviews all planning applications that might affect the parish and makes recommendations to Huntingdonshire District Council, which is the local planning authority for the parish. The parish council also represents the views of the parish on issues such as local transport, policing and the environment. The parish council raises its own tax to pay for these services, known as the parish precept, which is collected as part of the Council Tax.  The parish council has eight councillors and normally meets six times a year.

Great Paxton was in the historic and administrative county of Huntingdonshire until 1965. From 1965, the village was part of the new administrative county of Huntingdon and Peterborough. Then in 1974, following the Local Government Act 1972, Great Paxton became a part of the county of Cambridgeshire.

The second tier of local government is Huntingdonshire District Council which is a non-metropolitan district of Cambridgeshire and has its headquarters in Huntingdon. Huntingdonshire District Council has 52 councillors representing 29 district wards. Huntingdonshire District Council collects the council tax, and provides services such as building regulations, local planning, environmental health, leisure and tourism. Great Paxton is a part of the district ward of Gransden and The Offords and is represented on the district council by two councillors. District councillors serve for four-year terms following elections to Huntingdonshire District Council.

For Great Paxton the highest tier of local government is Cambridgeshire County Council which has administration buildings in Cambridge. The county council provides county-wide services such as major road infrastructure, fire and rescue, education, social services, libraries and heritage services. Cambridgeshire County Council consists of 69 councillors representing 60 electoral divisions. Great Paxton is part of the electoral division of Buckden, Gransden and The Offords and is represented on the county council by one councillor.

At Westminster Great Paxton is in the parliamentary constituency of Huntingdon, and elects one Member of Parliament (MP) by the first past the post system of election. Great Paxton is represented in the House of Commons by Jonathan Djanogly (Conservative). Jonathan Djanogly has represented the constituency since 2001. The previous member of parliament was John Major (Conservative) who represented the constituency between 1983 and 2001.

Geography
The village lies on the eastern side of the Great Ouse river valley on a subsoil that is mainly Oxford clay.

The village stands on the B1043 that runs between St Neots in the south and Offord D'Arcy in the north.

Demography

Population
In the period 1801 to 1901 the population of Great Paxton was recorded every ten years by the UK census.  During this time the population was in the range of 201 (the lowest was in 1811) and 415 (the highest was in 1841).

From 1901, a census was taken every ten years with the exception of 1941 (due to the Second World War).

All population census figures from report Historic Census figures Cambridgeshire to 2011 by Cambridgeshire Insight.

In 2011, 96.3% of people described themselves as white, 2.2% as having mixed or multiple ethnic groups, 1.1% as being British Asian and 0.1% as having other ethnicity. 64.7% described themselves as Christian, 27.4% described themselves as having no religion, 6.7% did not specify a religion and 1% described themselves as having another religion.

Culture and Community
There is one public house in the village called The Bell.

The village is a multiple winner of the prestigious East Anglia Village of the Year competition, held every 3 years since 1955.

Transport
The East Coast Main Line between London and Edinburgh passes through the parish of Great Paxton.

Education
There is a primary school which is a Church of England school and has around 120 pupils aged from 4 to 11. Senior school pupils attend Longsands Academy in St Neots.

Religious Sites
The Minster Church of the Holy Trinity, Great Paxton is a grade I listed cruciform Saxon church dating from the 11th century. It is one of only three Anglo-Saxon aisled churches to be found today in England. The church was extended and much of it reconstructed in the 13th and 14th centuries when the current tower was built. The church was restored again in 1880 when the vestry was added.  Holy Trinity Great Paxton is part of the Benefice of Little Paxton, Great Paxton and Diddington in the St Neots' Deanery and the Diocese of Ely.  There is a canonical sundial on the south wall.

References

External links

Great Paxton village web site

Villages in Cambridgeshire
Huntingdonshire
Civil parishes in Cambridgeshire